Tonči Valčić (born 9 June 1978) is a Croatian former professional handball player who currently works as an assistant coach of Croatian club RK Zagreb.  

He was a member of the Croatia national team at the 2008 Summer Olympics.

Playing career
Valčić began his career in Croatian powerhouse RK Zagreb where he has played for the majority of this career.

Valčić played for three seasons in Germany for TV Grosswallstadt. He also played in Spain for CB Torrevieja and CB Ademar León before returning to Croatia.

Valčić debuted for the  national team  at the 1999 World Men's Handball Championship in Egypt.

He played for the national team from 1999 to 2010 winning the 2003 World Men's Handball Championship and coming to the finals of 2008 European Men's Handball Championship, 2009 World Men's Handball Championship and 2010 European Men's Handball Championship.

Coaching career
After end of playing career he became an assistant coach under the staff of Lino Červar in RK Zagreb, during the 2018–19 season.

Personal life
His younger brother is Josip Valčić.

Honours
Zagreb
Premier League 
Winner (13): 1996-97, 1997-98, 1998-99, 1999-00, 2008-09, 2009-10, 2010-11, 2011-12, 2012-13, 2013-14, 2014-15, 2015-16, 2016-17
Croatian Cup 
Winner (13): 1997, 1998, 1999, 2000, 2008, 2009, 2010, 2011, 2012, 2013, 2014, 2015, 2016, 2017

SEHA League 
Winner (1): 2012-13
Third place (4): 2011-12, 2013-14, 2014-15, 2015-16

CB Torrevieja
Honor B
Promotion (1): 2003-04

External links
European competition

References

1978 births
Living people
Croatian male handball players
Croatian expatriate sportspeople in Spain
Croatian expatriate sportspeople in Germany
Olympic handball players of Croatia
Handball players at the 2008 Summer Olympics
Sportspeople from Zadar
RK Zagreb players
Liga ASOBAL players